Admiral Mariot Arbuthnot (1711 – 31 January 1794) was a British admiral, who commanded the Royal Navy's North American station during the American War for Independence.

Early life
A native of Weymouth, Dorset in  England, Arbuthnot was the son of Robert Arbuthnot and Sarah, née Bury. Robert's father was the son of the Rev. Robert Arbuthnot, Presbyterian minister of Crichton & Cranston. Mariot Arbuthnot entered the Royal Navy in the late 1720s, became a lieutenant in 1739, and commander in 1746. In 1746 he was commander of the sloop , which captured two French privateers while employed as a cruiser in the channel. He was appointed post captain in 1747. On 22 June 1747 Arbuthnot became captain of the frigate .

Seven Years' War

Towards the end of the war he commanded .

American War of Independence

From 1775 to 1778, he was Resident Commissioner of the Navy, Halifax Nova Scotia. He was Lieutenant Governor of Nova Scotia, 1776–78. He was replaced in this role by Richard Hughes. It may have been about then that an armed schooner was named Arbuthnot after him. That same year he took up his appointment as commander-in-chief on the North American Station. Soon after arriving at his destination, he was blockaded in New York City harbour by the French fleet under Count d'Estaing.

In December 1779, Arbuthnot conveyed the troops of Sir Henry Clinton to Charleston, South Carolina, and cooperated with him in laying siege to that city. The surrender document signed by prominent citizens was addressed to him and Clinton.  On 26 September 1780 he was promoted to Vice-Admiral of the White. On 13 March 1781, he fought the French Newport squadron, at the Battle of Cape Henry, before returning to England.

Later life
He advanced by seniority to become, on 1 February 1793, Admiral of the Blue. He died in London the following year, leaving two sons, John and Charles.

That he was ignorant of the discipline of his profession was proved by his altercation with Sir George Rodney; that he was destitute of even a rudimentary knowledge of naval tactics was shown by his absurd conduct of the Battle of Cape Henry; and, for the rest, he appears in contemporary stories (cf. Morning Chronicle, 18 May 1781) as a coarse, blustering, foul-mouthed bully, and, in history, as a sample of the extremity to which the maladministration of Lord Sandwich had reduced the British Navy.

Admiral Arbuthnot was the nephew of Dr. John Arbuthnot,  the satirist and mathematician.

References

External links
 
 
 The Georgian Era
 
 

|-

Mariot Arbuthnot
Royal Navy personnel of the American Revolutionary War
Governors of the Colony of Nova Scotia
English people of Scottish descent
People from Weymouth, Dorset
Royal Navy admirals
Royal Navy personnel of the Seven Years' War
1711 births
1794 deaths